, is an asteroid on an eccentric orbit, classified as near-Earth object and potentially hazardous asteroid of the Apollo group, approximately 2 kilometers in diameter. This suspected tumbler and relatively slow rotator was discovered by LINEAR in 1999.

Discovery 

The asteroid was discovered on 14 July 1999, by the Lincoln Near-Earth Asteroid Research (LINEAR) team at Lincoln Laboratory's Experimental Test Site, near Socorro, New Mexico, USA, at an apparent magnitude of 18, using a 1.0-meter reflector.

Its first observation was made by the Catalina Sky Survey in June 1999, extending the asteroid's observation arc by one month prior to its official discovery observation.

Orbit and classification 
 
 has a well-determined orbit with an uncertainty of 0. The body orbits the Sun at a distance of 0.7–2.8 AU once every 2 years and 4 months (852 days). Its orbit has an eccentricity of 0.58 and an inclination of 7° with respect to the ecliptic. The asteroid also makes close approaches to Venus and Mars.

Physical characteristics 

The rare Q-type asteroid is one of only 20 characterized bodies of this spectral type in the SMASS taxonomic scheme.

Rotation period 

Several rotational lightcurves were obtained from photometric observations by Czech astronomer Petr Pravec at Ondřejov Observatory and American astronomer Brian Warner at his private Palmer Divide Observatory, Colorado. Best rated results gave a rotation period of  hours with an exceptionally high brightness variation of 1.1 magnitude. Pravec's alternative period of 122 hours was later not supported by Warner. However, there are still other periods possible due to sparse photometric data points. The asteroid is also suspected to be in a tumbling motion, which makes the determination of its period more complex. For an asteroid of its size, it is a relatively slow rotator.

Diameter and albedo 

According to the survey carried out by the Japanese Akari satellite, the asteroid has a high albedo of 0.35 and a diameter of 1.43 kilometers. Observations by the Keck Observatory in the thermal infrared gave a refined albedo of 0.13–0.14 with a larger diameter of 2.22 kilometers.

Chelyabinsk meteor fragment 

 is suspected to be related to the 20-meter Chelyabinsk meteor, which exploded as a bright fireball over Russia on 15 February 2013. Analysis showed similar orbits for both bodies and suggested that they were once part of the same object.

Numbering and naming 

This minor planet was numbered by the Minor Planet Center on 30 August 2004. As of 2018, it has not been named.

Notes

References

External links 
 Asteroid Lightcurve Database (LCDB), query form (info )
 Asteroids and comets rotation curves, CdR – Observatoire de Genève, Raoul Behrend
 
 
 

086039
086039
086039
086039
19990714